The Women's Hockey Champions Challenge II is a former international field hockey competition. The tournament was only contested on two occasions, in 2009 and 2011.

In 2011, the tournament was disbanded to make way for the FIH Hockey World League, which began in 2012.

Belgium and India were the only teams to triumph at the Champions Challenge II in its two editions, with Belgium being the most recent winners.

Results

Summaries

Successful national teams

Team appearances

External links

 
Champions Challenge II